Marvel may refer to:

Business
 Marvel Entertainment, an American entertainment company
 Marvel Comics, the primary imprint of Marvel Entertainment
 Marvel Universe, a fictional shared universe
 Marvel Music, an imprint of Marvel Comics
 Marvel Productions, a former television and film studio subsidiary of the Marvel Entertainment Group
 Marvel Toys, a former toy company
 Marvel Studios, a film and television studio that is a subsidiary of Walt Disney Studios
 Marvel Cinematic Universe, an American media franchise and shared universe centered on a series of superhero films and television series
 Marvel Television, a television studio subsidiary
 Marvel Animation, an animation production company
 Marvel (food), a brand of milk powder produced by British-based Premier Foods

Comics
 Marvel Comics, a comic book publisher
 Marvel Illustrated, an imprint of Marvel Comics
 Marvel Press, another imprint
 Marvel UK, an imprint formed in 1972 for the British market
 Marvels, a 1994 four-issue miniseries
 Captain Marvel (DC Comics), also known as Shazam, a fictional superhero
 Captain Marvel (Marvel Comics), several Marvel Comics characters
 Mary Marvel, a Fawcett Comics / DC Comics character
 Ms. Marvel, several Marvel Comics superheroes

Military
 , a Royal Navy destroyer
 , a US Navy World War II minesweeper transferred to the Soviet Union under Lend-Lease

Music
 "Marvel", a song from the album Potpourri by P-MODEL
 The Marvels (band), a UK reggae group from 1962 to 1982
 The Marvelettes, a 1960s group briefly known as the Marvels
 The Marvels, backing group for Charles Lloyd from 2016
 Märvel (band), a hard-rock band from Linköping, Sweden

Places

United States
 Marvel, Alabama, an unincorporated community
 Marvel, Colorado, an unincorporated community
 Marvel, West Virginia, an unincorporated community
 Marvel Cave, Missouri

Antarctica
 Mount Marvel, Oates Land

Vehicles
 Marvel (automobile), built by the Marvel Motor Car Company in 1907
 Mississippi State University XV-11 Marvel, an experimental aircraft of the 1960s
 Roewe Marvel X, Roewe Marvel R and MG Marvel R, electric sport utility vehicles manufactured by SAIC Motor

Other uses
 Marvel (name), a list of people and fictional characters with either the surname or given name
 Marvel Gymnasium, a former multipurpose gymnasium in Providence, Rhode Island, United States
 Marvel Stadium, a multipurpose stadium in Melbourne, Australia
 Marvels (Theopompus), a work by the ancient Greek author Theopompus
 MARVEL transmembrane domain, as found in proteins such as CMTM2
 Mars Volcanic Emission and Life Scout, one of four finalists proposed for the first Mars Scout Program mission

See also 
 Captain Marvel (disambiguation)
 Marvell (disambiguation)
 Marvels (disambiguation)
 The Marvels (disambiguation)
 The Marvelettes
 Marcel (disambiguation)